Matt Koleszar (born September 21, 1981) is an American politician serving as a member of the Michigan House of Representatives from the 22nd district (Formerly District 20). He was first elected in November 2018, defeating then-incumbent Jeff Noble (R). In 2020, Rep. Koleszar retained his seat against John Lacny in the November election. 

Due to the decennial re-districting of Michigan's legislative district, Koleszar ran for the 22nd district in 2022. Koleszar defeated Cathryn Neracher by 8.4% in the November election, making him the first Representative for the new 22nd District.

Education 
Koleszar earned a Bachelor of Arts degree in secondary education with a focus on social studies and English from Saginaw Valley State University in 2006. He earned a Master of Arts degree in English studies for teachers from Eastern Michigan University in 2011.

Career 
Before his election to the position of state representative, Koleszar had worked in multiple positions in the education field. This included teacher and coach in the Airport Community School District and president of the Airport Education Association in Carleton, Michigan. He taught middle school and high school social studies and English for 12 years, and coached cross country and baseball.

Michigan House of Representatives 
2020: Koleszar has been elected by his colleagues to the position of Democratic whip and serves on the Education Policy and Elections and Ethics committees. Koleszar previously served as assistant Democratic leader and sat on the House Education Committee and House Health Policy Committee. He has introduced legislation on issues ranging from air quality to school libraries, as well as tuition assistance for the children of fallen Police Officers and Firefighters.

2022: Koleszar has been appointed as chair of the House Education Committee. He also serves as a member of the following committees: higher education, elections, labor, school aid.

District 22 (Drawn 2022) 
The 22nd district comprises five municipalities: Plymouth City, Livonia City (Partial), Northville City(Partial), Plymouth Township (Partial), Northville Township (Partial)

Electoral history

References

External links 
 Matt Koleszar at gophouse.org
 Matt Koleszar at ballotpedia.org
 Matt Koleszar at votesmart.org

Living people
Saginaw Valley State University alumni
Eastern Michigan University alumni
Democratic Party members of the Michigan House of Representatives
21st-century American politicians
People from Royal Oak, Michigan
1981 births